The year 2008 is the 1st year in the history of Jewels, a mixed martial arts promotion based in Japan. In 2008 Jewels held 1 event, Jewels 1st Ring.

Events list

Jewels 1st Ring

Jewels 1st Ring was an event held on November 16, 2008, at Shinjuku Face in Tokyo, Japan.

Results

See also 
 Jewels

References

Jewels (mixed martial arts) events
2008 in mixed martial arts